"White van man" is a stereotype used in the United Kingdom for a smaller-sized commercial van driver, typically perceived as a selfish, inconsiderate driver who is mostly petit bourgeois and often aggressive. According to this stereotype, the "white van man" is typically an independent tradesperson, such as a builder, plumber or locksmith, self-employed, or running a small enterprise, for whom driving a commercial vehicle is not their main line of business, as it would be for a professional freight-driver.

Usage
The first recorded use in the British press was in an article titled "Number is up for White Van Man – scourge of the road." published by The Sunday Times on 18 May 1997 written by Jonathan Leake, that paper's then-transport editor. Later in 1997, it was used by BBC Radio 2's Sarah Kennedy. She was made honorary president of the First Ford Transit Owner's Club in 2005.

The Sun newspaper ran a regular "White Van Man" column for some years in which the driver of a light goods vehicle was interviewed in his van on the issues of the day. These columns were accompanied by a picture of whichever driver had been interviewed leaning out of his cab.

The term was used in 2010 as part of road safety campaigns by the Freight Transport Association.

See also
 Essex man
 Pickup truck
 The man on the Clapham omnibus

References

External links
 BBC Radio 4 documentary on White Van Man Speaks
 Academic study of white van overtaking habits around cyclists by Dr Ian Walker
 SIRC report: White Van Man

British culture
Stereotypes of the working class
English phrases
Stereotypes of working-class men
Social class in the United Kingdom
Socioeconomic stereotypes